First Songs, initially credited to "Gwyn and Will", is the debut album of British singer-songwriter Gwyneth Herbert and composer and acoustic guitarist Will Rutter. Comprising both original songs and standards, it was launched at London's Pizza Express Jazz Club in September 2003. The Herbert/Rutter song "Sweet Insomnia" featured guest vocals from Jamie Cullum.

Reception
Described by BBC Music as a "lovingly crafted debut", the album received a significant amount of radio airplay on Jazz FM and BBC Radio 2, and was promoted by Michael Parkinson.

Writing in The Sunday Times, reviewer Clive Davis said: "If Gwyneth Herbert is not a star before long, I will eat my CD player. The sultry young singer’s partnership with guitarist Will Rutter has caused a stir on London's club circuit, and their debut album — artfully produced and arranged by vocalist Ian Shaw — lives up to that promise, blending pop and jazz values".

Track listing

Personnel
 Gwyneth Herbert – vocals
 Will Rutter – guitar
 Mark Hodgson – bass
 Tom Mason – bass
 Andy Nice – cello
 Josefina Cupido – drums and percussion
 Ben Godfrey – trumpet
 Guy Barker – trumpet
 Jamie Cullum – vocals
 Ian Shaw – keyboards and percussion

Production
The album was produced by Ian Shaw, who arranged all the songs (except "No Other Love", which was arranged by Will Rutter).
It was recorded by Joe Leach at the Cowshed Recording Studio, London between June and September 2003.

References

External links
Gwyneth Herbert: official website

2003 debut albums
Gwyneth Herbert albums
Albums produced by Ian Shaw